On His Majesty's Service or On Her Majesty's Service (depending on the sex of the reigning monarch), is an official franking commonly seen on correspondence from government departments in the United Kingdom, Canada, Australia and other countries that share the same monarch as their head of state (now known as Commonwealth realms).

The expanded form, On His/Her Britannic Majesty's Service has been used for international correspondence, for example for mail to British diplomatic posts in other countries.

In Canada, the initialism O.H.M.S. may be written on an envelope instead of using postage stamps for any letters being sent to the House of Commons of Canada or to any member of the Parliament of Canada. Letters sent from lieutenant-governors may also bear the O.H.M.S. mark. The French translation Service de sa Majesté (SDSM) is also used.

In Australia before Federation, letters in envelopes franked with the O.H.M.S. mark were exempt from postal fees.

In popular culture 
O.H.M.S. is a 1937 action comedy film.
 The title of Ian Fleming's 1963 James Bond novel On Her Majesty's Secret Service, along with its film adaptation, is a play on the term.

See also
 Britannic Majesty for the designation On His Britannic Majesty's Service.

References

Postal systems
Philatelic terminology